Trombone and Voices is an album by J. J. Johnson with an Orchestra and Choir arranged and conducted by Frank De Vol which was released on the Columbia label.

Reception

Allmusic awarded the album 3 stars.

Track listing
 "Jennie's Song" (Bernard Herrmann) - 3:31
 "Only The Lonely" (Jimmy Van Heusen, Sammy Cahn) - 3:32
 "Sometimes I Feel Like a Motherless Child" (Traditional) - 3:12
 "In a Sentimental Mood" (Duke Ellington) - 2:35
 "Get Out of Town" (Cole Porter) - 2:16
 "I'm Glad There Is You" (Jimmy Dorsey, Paul Madeira) - 2:27
 "You're My Girl" (Jule Styne, Cahn) - 3:59
 "To the Ends of the Earth" (Noel Sherman, Joe Sherman) - 2:59
 "What Is There to Say" (Vernon Duke, Yip Harburg) - 2:20
 "Lazy Bones" (Hoagy Carmichael, Johnny Mercer) - 3:00

Personnel
J. J. Johnson – trombone
Unidentified Orchestra and Choir arranged and conducted by Frank De Vol

References

Columbia Records albums
J. J. Johnson albums
1960 albums
Albums arranged by Frank De Vol
Albums conducted by Frank De Vol